Lesueurina platycephala, the Flathead pygmy-stargazer, is a species of southern sandfish endemic to the coastal waters of southern Australia. This species grows to a length of  SL. This species is the only known member of its genus. It is an ambush predator which occurs from Fraser Island in Queensland south along the Australian coast, including Tasmania, and west to Coral Bay, Western Australia. The generic name honours the French artist and naturalist Charles Alexandre Lesueur (1778-1846) who visited Australia on the vessels Géographe and Naturaliste under the leadership of Nicolas Baudin (1880-1804) and who later worked as an ichthyologist in the Academy of Natural Sciences of Philadelphia.

References

Leptoscopidae
Taxa named by Henry Weed Fowler
Fish described in 1908